Parchkuh (also Romanized as Parchkūh; also known as Parchahkūh) is a village in Rudbar-e Shahrestan Rural District, Alamut-e Gharbi District, Qazvin County, Qazvin Province, Iran. At the 2006 census, its population was 300, in 80 families.

References 

Populated places in Qazvin County